The Syro-Malabar Catholic Eparchy of Kothamangalam is an East Syriac Catholic eparchy in India, under the Syro-Malabar Catholic Church. It was established  by Pope Pius XII in 1957. Mar George Madathikandathil is the eparch since 10 January 2013.

Situated in the central region of the Indian state of Kerala, the Eparchy of Kothamangalam lies extended in Ernakulam and Idukki districts of Kerala, neighbouring the Archeparchy of Ernakulam-Angamaly, eparchies of Irinjalakuda, Idukki and Pala. Mar Mathew Pothanamuzhy was the first bishop of the eparchy. He was succeeded by Mar George Punnakottil served as the bishop until 10 January 2013, when his resignation was accepted by the synod.

Boundaries
It is bounded on the north by the Periyar river,
on the east by the  Uzhavathadam river, Cheeyapara Waterfalls, and the Kulamavu Dam;
on the west by Kolenchery,
and on the south by  Ramamangalam, Memuri, Marady, Arakuzha, Purapuzha and Karimkunnam villages, Vazhipuzha river, eastern boundary of Velliamatam and southern boundary of Thodupuzha taluk.

Population
The Kothamangalam Diocese has a total of approximately 231,300 faithful under its jurisdiction.

Foranes & Parishes

1. Kothamangalam Forane (St George Cathedral Forane church)

1. Kothamangalam
2. Injoor
3. Kallelimedu
4. Keerampara
5. Kottapady
6. Kuruppampady
7. Kutthunkal
8. Kuttampuzha
9. Malippara
10. Manikandamchal
11. Mathirappilly
12. Nadukani
13. Nedungapra
14. Nellimattom
15. Njayappilly
16. Pooyamkutty
17. Thrikkariyoor
18. Urulanthanni
19. Vadattupara
20. Veliyelchaal
21. Vettampara
22. Allungal
23. Muttathuppara

2. Arakuzha Forane (Marth Mariam Syro-Malabar Catholic Forane Church, Arakuzha)

1. Arakuzha
2. Arikkuzha
3. Meenkunnam (St. Joseph's Catholic Church)
4. Peringuzha
5. Perumballur
6. Thottakkara

3. Kaliyar Forane (St. Ritha Forane Church)

1. Kaliyar
2. Koduvely
3. Mannukkad
4. Mundanmudy
5. Njarakkad
6. Thennathur
7. Thommankuthu
8. Vannappuram

4. Karimannoor Forane

1. Karimannoor
2. Cheenikkuzhy
3. Cheppukulam
4. Chilavu
5. Kaithappara
6. Malayinchi
7. Mulappuram
8. Neyyasserry
9. Pallikkamuri
10. Peringasserry
11. Thattakkuzha
12. Udumbannoor
13. Uppukunnu

5. Mailakkombu Forane

1. Mailakkombu
2. Ezhallur
3. Kaloor
4. Nakappuzha
5. Perumbillichira
6. Thazhuvamkunnu

6. Maarika Forane

1. Maarika
2. Kolady
3. Kuninji
4. Nediyasala
5. Purappuzha

7. Muthalakkodam Forane

1. Muthalakkodam
2. Chalasserry
3. Kodikkulam
4. Paarappuzha
5. Vandamattom
6. Vazhakkala

8. Muvattupuzha Forane (Holy Magi Syro-Malabar Catholic Forane Church, Muvattupuzha)

1. Muvattupuzha
2. St Sebastian's Church Anicadu
3. Karakkunnam
4. Marady
5. Mekkadambu
6. Mudavoor
7. Muvattupuzha East
8. Randaar
9. Vazhappilly East

9. Oonnukal Forane(Little Flower Syro Malabar Catholic Forane Church)

1. Oonnukal
2. Ambikapuram
3. Injathotty
4. Maamalakkandam
5. Neendapaara
6. Neryamangalam
7. Parikkanni
8. Pazhambillichal
9. Perumannur

10. Paingottoor Forane

1. Paingottoor
2. Kalvarigiri (Kulappuram)
3. Kadavoor
4. Mullaringad
5. Pothanikkad
6. Punnamattom
7. Rajagir (Vellallu)

11. Thodupuzha Forane

1. Thodupuzha
2. Alakkodu
3. Anjiri
4. Chittur
5. Kalayanthani
6. Kallanikkal
7. Methotty
8. Nazareth hill (Thoyipra)
9. Nediyakaad
10. Pannimattom
11. Ponnanthanam
12. Thalayanad
13. Thodupuzha East
14. Vettimattom

12. Vazhakkulam Forane (St. George Syro-Malabar Catholic Forane Church) (വാഴക്കുളം ഫൊറോന പള്ളി)

1. Vazhakulam
2. Ayavana
3. Beslehem
4. Enanelloor
5. Kadalikkad
6. Kalloorkkad
7. Kavakkad
8. Nadukkara
9. Vadakode

Priests

Educational institutions

Notable individuals
George Karakunnel

References

External links

Syro-Malabar Kothamangalam Eparchy
Archdiocese of Ernakulam
Catholic-Hierarchy entry

Eastern Catholic dioceses in India
Archdiocese of Ernakulam-Angamaly
Syro-Malabar Catholic dioceses
Christian organizations established in 1957
Roman Catholic dioceses and prelatures established in the 20th century
1957 establishments in Kerala